Sinni may refer to:

Sinni (river), Italy
Sinni, Oman